Javānmardi is a Persian word which refers broadly to the ideological or philosophical underpinnings an ethical system dominated by altruism, magnanimity and liberality linked to chivalry, and particularly spiritual chivalry. It is a concept usually discussed within Sufi contexts. It is also referred to (primarily in Arabic) as futuwwa.

Luti and Dash mashti

The lutis ( lūtī) were a unique type of masculine men with roots from the Persian Sufi brotherhoods, ayyārs, and futuwwa ideas in 15th-19th century Persia. They had distinct rites, attitudes, clothing, and traits, most notably practicing Pahlevani and zoorkhaneh rituals. Their spiritual and martial model of masculinity was javānmardi, which means the state of being javānmard.

In late 19th century, a unifying national Persian masculine gender identity was gradually formed during the political and social developments and modernization/Westernization in late Qajar (1785-1925), particularly during the Persian Constitutional Revolution (1905-1911), and first Pahlavi periods (1925-1941), which came into conflict with the ideals, norms, traits, and appearance of the lutis; the latter gradually became menacing, counter-normative, deviant, anxiety-provoking, chaotic, violent, and sexually ambiguous.

In popular culture

Dash Mashti was an influential subgenre of the Iranian cinema that embodied javanmardi ideals and ideas. Most of these films were produced in 1950s in Iran. The best example is considered the 1971 movie Dash Akol.

In modern Iran

In modern times the concept indicates to an idealized configuration of masculinity in Iran. Some historical actors are considered of representing the javanmardi-ethos paradigmatically. The merchant Tayyeb Hajj Reza'i (1912-1963) is nowadays remembered as the "javanmard-e bozorg", i. e. the "great ideal man".

References

Sufi philosophy
Persian words and phrases
Iranian culture